The year 2019 is the 3rd year in the history of the World Lethwei Championship, a Lethwei promotion based in Myanmar.

List of events

WLC 7: Mighty Warriors 

WLC 7: Mighty Warriors was a Lethwei event held by World Lethwei Championship on February 22, 2019 at the Mandalar Thiri Indoor Stadium in Mandalay, Myanmar's 2nd largest city.

Background 
The event was the first in Lethwei history to be broadcast internationally on UFC Fight Pass. Newly signed to the WLC, Vietnamese ONE Championship fighter Nguyễn Trần Duy Nhất made his debut and defeated Cambodia's fighting star Pich Mtes Khmang who was at his second Lethwei appearance. The co-main event featured Myanmar fighter Shwe Yar Mann who had an incredible year 2018 where he went undefeated in 10 fights. He took on Ukrainian Sasha Moisa who also had an amazing year winning two multi-men tournaments in Thailand. In the main event, the recently crowned Light Welterweight Myanmar National Champion Saw Htoo Aung faced Portugal's Antonio Faria for a chance to trade his silver belt for an opportunity at the gold belt. Faria had already won two fights in World Lethwei Championship and was moving up a weight class for this bout. The event crowned the first Light Welterweight World Lethwei Champion when Faria won by 2nd-round knockout over Saw Htoo Aung.

Results

WLC 8: Karen Spirit 

WLC 8: Karen Spirit was a Lethwei event held by World Lethwei Championship on May 5, 2019 at the Chit Tu Myaing Park in Hpa-an, Myanmar.

Background
The event was the first major Lethwei event held in Kayin State The Kayin State is the epicentre for Lethwei culture. The sport is practiced in all of Myanmar, but it is held in higher regard among the Kayin, one of the 135 ethnic groups in Myanmar. The WLC brought the modern Lethwei rules for the first time to the State. In the main event, Mite Yine returned to action against Cambodia's Morn Samet who stepped up as a late replacement for Shahmarzade Amil. Myanmar's National Champion Kyaw Zin Latt replaced Soe Lin Oo in the co-main event against the Muay Thai star from Germany, Burutlek Petchyindee Academy. Injuries had hounded the headline fighters at the event, which prompting a re-shuffle of the card. Mite Yine who is a native son of Kayin, won the gold at 2013 SEA Games and won the coveted Lethwei Golden Belt twice. The sole women's match was between ethnic Karen Naw Phaw Law Eh and Vietnam's Huynh Ha Huu Hieu. Naw Phaw Law Eh also known as 'Eh Eh' previously won gold medals SEA Games in judo and a bronze in a regional wrestling competition. Thway Thit Aung faced Tiger Muaythai's David McCarthy from Ireland. Mite Yine won by split decision.

Results

WLC 9: King of Nine Limbs 

WLC 9: King of Nine Limbs was a Lethwei event held on August 2, 2019 at the Mandalar Thiri Indoor Stadium in Mandalay, Myanmar.

Background 
In March 2019, the WLC announced that it had signed Lethwei superstar, undefeated Lethwei world champion Dave Leduc to an exclusive contract. The exclusive contract would make it impossible for him to defend his various titles. Leduc held a press conference at the Karaweik Palace in Yangon to announce that he was vacating tree of his four Lethwei world titles. For Leduc's debut, the promotion signed former TUF competitor and UFC welterweight Seth Baczynski. Baczynski felt confident leading up to the fight because he had more fighting experience than Leduc. The bout was for the inaugural Cruiserweight World Lethwei Championship. In the co-main event, incumbent Light Middleweight World Lethwei Champion Artur Saladiak faced Ukrainian Champion Sasha Moisa. Moisa became the rightful challenger to the title after the strong statement he made in his Lethwei debut knocking out Myanmar star Shwe Yar Man at WLC 7. During the fight, Moisa swarmed Saladiak with precise right hands and dropped Saladiak on several occasions, winning the Light Middleweight title in a unanimous decision victory. The event also featured France's Souris Manfredi and Eh Yanut from Cambodia and Manfredi became the first winner in the newly created women's division by defeated against Eh Yanut. In the main event, Dave Leduc landed a solid elbow which exploded Bacynski's left ear. He then knocked out Baczynski with punches to win the inaugural Cruiserweight World Lethwei Championship.

Since the event had a significant viewership success on UFC Fight Pass and won awards in Asia, Dave Leduc received a $50,000 bonus for his performance and marketing efforts.

Fight Card

WLC 10: Fearless Tigers 

WLC 10: Fearless Tigers was a Lethwei event held on October 4, 2019 in Mandalay, Myanmar.

Background 
This event was done in partnership with the Mandalay-based Lethwei promotion Great Tiger Group, who promoted five bouts after the live international broadcast on UFC Fight Pass. The main event for the international broadcast featured Lethwei World's 2019 breakthrough fighter Thway Thit Win Hlaing against Thai-German Muaythai champion Burutlek Petchyindee Academy, both previously undefeated in World Lethwei Championship. Thway Thit Win Hlaing has been on a winning streak by defeating Saw Ba Oo, Shwe Yar Mann and Shan Ko in the first three WLC events, before taking a brief hiatus. Burutlek Petchyindee Academy made an instant impact in the world of lethwei when he knocked out former light welterweight champion Kyaw Zin Latt with one punch in his debut. That impressive performance has won him a date against Thway Thit Win Hlaing. In the co-main event, Nicola Barke was making her Lethwei debut against Bianka Balajt from Hungary which she won by unanimous decision. In the main event, Thway Thit Win Hlaing landed an overhand right to knockout Burutlek Petchyindee Academy to continue his undefeated streak.

Fight Card

See also
2019 in ILFJ

References

World Lethwei Championship events
2019 in Lethwei
2019 in kickboxing
2019 in Burmese sport